Fonterutoli is a village in Tuscany, central Italy, administratively a frazione of the comune of Castellina in Chianti, province of Siena. At the time of the 2001 census its population was 80.

Fonterutoli is about 20 km from Siena and 5 km from Castellina in Chianti.

References 

Frazioni of Castellina in Chianti